Angiotensin II receptor type 2, also known as the AT2 receptor is a protein that in humans is encoded by the AGTR2 gene.

Function 

Angiotensin II is a potent pressor hormone and a primary regulator of aldosterone secretion. It is an important effector controlling blood pressure and volume in the cardiovascular system. It acts through at least two types of receptors termed AT1 and AT2. AGTR2 belongs to a family 1 of G protein-coupled receptors. It is an integral membrane protein. It plays a role in the central nervous system and cardiovascular functions that are mediated by the renin–angiotensin system. This receptor mediates programmed cell death (apoptosis). In adults, it is highly expressed in myometrium with lower levels in adrenal gland and fallopian tube. It is highly expressed in fetal kidney and intestine. The human AGTR2 gene is composed of three exons and spans at least 5 kb. Exons 1 and 2 encode for 5' untranslated mRNA sequence and exon 3 harbors the entire uninterrupted open reading frame.

Stimulation of AT2 by the selective agonist CGP 42112A increases mucosal nitric oxide production.

Model organisms 

				
Model organisms have been used in the study of AGTR2 function. A conditional knockout mouse line, called Agtr2tm1a(EUCOMM)Wtsi was generated as part of the International Knockout Mouse Consortium program — a high-throughput mutagenesis project to generate and distribute animal models of disease to interested scientists — at the Wellcome Trust Sanger Institute.

Male and female animals underwent a standardized phenotypic screen to determine the effects of deletion. Twenty one tests were carried out on mutant mice, but no significant abnormalities were observed.

Gene 
Angiotensin II receptor type 2 (AGTR2) gene is a protein coding gene responsible for encoding AGTR2, the integral membrane protein that binds to two different G-protein coupled receptors. AGTR2 has recently been discovered to play a role in modifying lung disease. This receptor functions to mediate signaling in lung fibrosis and regulate nitric oxide synthase expression in pulmonary endothelium.  AGTR2 has recently been prescribed as a target for lung inflammation therapy in cases of cystic fibrosis (CF). The X-chromosome region associated with CF lung disease is located in a non-coding region 3′ of the AGTR2 gene. The modification effect is likely due to variation in gene regulation rather than a change in protein coding sequence.

Variants at the X-chromosome locus containing AGTR2 gene were identified as significantly associating with lung function in patients with cystic fibrosis. Genetically modified mouse studies determined that absence of the AGTR2 gene normalized pulmonary function indicators in two independent CF mouse models. Furthermore, pharmacological antagonism of AGTR2 signaling improved lung function in CF mice to near wild-type levels. Manipulation of the angiotensin-signaling pathway to reduce AGTR2 signaling may be translatable for the treatment or prevention of CF.

Interactions 

Angiotensin II receptor type 2 has been shown to interact with MTUS1.

See also 
 Angiotensin II receptor

References

Further reading

External links 
 
 

G protein-coupled receptors
Genes mutated in mice